Jawaharbhai Pethaljibhai Chavda is an Indian politician. He was elected to the Gujarat Legislative Assembly from Manavadar in the 2017 Gujarat Legislative Assembly election as a member of the Indian National Congress.

He was one of the four members of the Indian National Congress who shifted to Bharatiya Janata Party post 2017 Gujarat Legislative Assembly election. He won in the by-election in 2019 from the same seat. He became the Cabinet minister of Tourism and Fisheries  in the Vijay Rupani ministry in March 2019.

References

1964 births
Living people
Gujarat MLAs 2017–2022
Bharatiya Janata Party politicians from Gujarat
Indian National Congress politicians from Gujarat